A list of films produced in the United Kingdom in 1954 (see 1954 in film):

1954

See also
 1954 in British music
 1954 in British television
 1954 in the United Kingdom

References

External links

1954
Films
British